Stuckey & Murray is a comedy music duo from Brooklyn, New York.

Andy Stuckey and Jon Murray met when they were NBC Pages in New York City in the early 2000s. They formed the group in 2001 and have produced two full-length albums, Destination: Rock Bottom and Mythical Fornication. Destination: Rock Bottom was recorded over a weekend in Austin, Texas and Mythical Fornication was tracked in Brooklyn, NY.

Two of the duo's songs from their album Mythical Fornication are featured in the independent film, Stuck Like Chuck.
Stuckey & Murray's videos have acquired approximately 20 million hits across the internet YouTube. The duo created a music video series for Heavy.com and NBC's Dotcomedy in 2006.

Aside from performing, both Andy Stuckey and Jon Murray are currently freelance TV producers and writers in New York City. They have worked in television production for over 10 years.

Television Performance 

Stuckey & Murray have been featured on several basic cable programs.
 E! 2008 "Pre-Oscar Show"(E!)
 "Cash Cab" (Discovery Channel)
 "It's On With Alexa Chung" (MTV)
 "Webjunk" (Vh1)
 "The Chelsea Handler Show" (E!)
 "Attack of the Show" (G4)
 "The Sauce" (Fuse)
 "Attack of the Geeks" (E!)
 "Munchies" (Fuse)
 "First Look" (NBC)
 College Sports Television Promos
 E4 in the United Kingdom

Live Performance 

This summer Stuckey & Murray performed at the BamaJam music festival in Enterprise, Alabama, alongside The Defibulators. The two groups then traveled on The Redneck Riviera Tour and played shows in Atlanta, Athens, Savannah, Nashville, Birmingham, and at The Florabama.

In 2007 Stuckey and Murray performed at the Edinburgh Fringe festival, and were reviewed by Malcolm Jack of "The Scotsman", as "Great stuff, in short, for 15-year-olds and Nuts readers". They have also performed at All Points West, Reading and Leeds music festivals, Latitude Music festival, The Virgin Music Festival in Toronto, and The Montreal Comedy Festival.

Also at the Edinburgh Fringe festival Stuckey and Murray made a video of their song "Its Every Cuss Word We Know", which is a spoof of an REM song. The video went viral, probably in large part due to its appeal to 15-year-olds.

Stuckey and Murray's ill-fated appearance on "Showtime at the Apollo" was met with a great deal of derision by the audience and caused host Steve Harvey to announce "Unh-unh, these white boys ain't RIGHT!"

Fashion Line 

In 2008, Stuckey & Murray ventured into the realm of fashion with their invention of The Fuxedo. The Fuxedo is a fully functional, cross between a jumpsuit and a tuxedo. Murray even wore his to his sister's wedding. The duo hopes to have The Fuxedo in production by spring of 2011.

Personal life 
Andy Stuckey has diabetes.  The duo wrote a song about how Stuckey discovered he got diabetes on Christmas Day in a song called "Santa Gave Me Diabetes."

Jon Murray created funny videos while growing up in Williston, VT, too, including a satire of the Beastie Boys' "Sabotage".

References 

American musical duos
American comedy musicians
American comedy duos
Performing groups established in 2001